Parliamentary elections were held in July 1984 in Venda, an independent bantustan in what is now Limpopo province of South Africa. The Venda National Party won 41 of the 45 elected seats in the Legislative Assembly.

Results

References

Venda
Elections in Venda
July 1984 events in Africa